Following is a list of all Article III United States federal judges appointed by President Richard Nixon during his presidency. In total Nixon appointed 235 Article III federal judges, surpassing the previous record of 193 set by Franklin D. Roosevelt. Among these were 4 Justices to the Supreme Court of the United States (including 1 Chief Justice), 45 judges to the United States Courts of Appeals, 179 judges to the United States district courts, 3 judges to the United States Court of Customs and Patent Appeals, 3 judges to the United States Court of Claims and 1 judge to the United States Customs Court.

None of Nixon's appointees remain in active service, however 2 appellate judges and 1 district judge remain on senior status. Four additional district judges appointed by Nixon are in senior status as appellate judges by the appointment of later presidents.

United States Supreme Court justices

Courts of appeals

District courts

Specialty courts (Article III)

United States Court of Customs and Patent Appeals

United States Court of Claims

United States Customs Court

Notes

Renominations

References
General

 

Specific

Sources
 Federal Judicial Center

Nixon

Richard Nixon-related lists